John Christian Hope (August 20, 1806 – July 9, 1879) was a Lutheran scholar, priest, secretary and president of the South Carolina Lutheran Seminary, Representative, and Senator in his native state of South Carolina.

J.C. Hope was born in Newberry District, South Carolina to Johann Christian Haupt and Christina Fellers. Johann Haupt was the son of a Hessian American Revolution veteran.
J.C. Hope and Louisa Eichleberger had three children, James Cornelius (August 23, 1834 - July 17, 1909), Mary Ann Catherine (February 14, 1835 - August 22, 1874) and John Julius (September 26, 1840 - December 20, 1852).

Lutheran studies 
J.C. Hope rode on horseback to Gettysburg, Pennsylvania during the late 1820s or early 1830s. He enrolled as a student at the Gettysburg Seminary. He was encouraged to attend by John Bachman. There he studied under Dr. Ernest Lewis Hazelius. About Hazelius he wrote in a letter to Rev. Bachman:

Humility is a striking attribute of his, yes, when spirits, far less noble, would traverse the highest summits, his is moving in the lowest valley.  And, though he can soar to the highest summits of the intellectual world, yet, he delights to move in the most inferior vales of wit.

Church service 
John Christian Hope graduated from the Seminary in 1831. He was ordained in 1832. He served the following churches.
St. Stephen's, Lexington, 1831–1834
St Michaels's, Columbia, 1834
Ebenezer, Columbia
Sandy Run, Swansea, 1832–1833
Colony, Newberry, 1850–1851
St. Luke's, Prosperity
St. Matherw's, Pomaria, 1838–1843
St. John's, Pomaria, 1843–1850
Bethlehem, Pomaria, 1832–1837
St. Paul's, Pomaria, 1834–1838
St. Peter's, Piney Woods
St. Johns, Lexington

References
 MS. letter, John C. Hope to the Rev. John Bachman, Nov. 6, 1830, S. C. Synod Archives.

1806 births
1879 deaths
People from Newberry County, South Carolina
Members of the South Carolina House of Representatives
American Episcopal priests
19th-century Lutheran clergy
19th-century American politicians
19th-century American Episcopalians
19th-century American clergy